Ernest House may refer to:

 Ernest House Sr. (1945–2011), American tribal leader
 Ernest R. House (born 1937), American academic